Talib is an Arabic name, and may refer to:

Given name

Talib El-Shibib
Talib Kweli, American MC  Rapper
Talib Zanna (born 1990), Nigerian basketball player in the Israel Basketball Premier League

Surname

Abu Talib (disambiguation) 
Ali ibn Abi Talib
Aqil ibn Abi Talib
Aqib Talib
Fakhitah bint Abi Talib
Ja'far ibn Abi Talib
Jumanah bint Abi Talib
Naji Talib
Ramli Ngah Talib

Zuhayr Talib Abd al-Sattar al-Naqib
Allama Talib Jauhri
Abdul Talib Zaki

See also
Rashida Tlaib, American politician of Palestinian decent

Arabic masculine given names